A reusable spacecraft is a class of spacecraft that have been designed with repeated launch, orbit, deorbit and atmospheric reentry in mind. This contrasts with conventional spacecraft which are designed to be expended (thrown away, allowed to burn during reentry) after use. Examples of reusable spacecraft are spaceplanes (such as the Space Shuttle orbiters and the Dream Chaser) and space capsules like the SpaceX Dragon. Such spacecraft need mechanisms to prevent the disintegration of the spacecraft and its occupants/cargo during reentry. Failure of such systems may be catastrophic, as what happened in the Space Shuttle Columbia disaster.

Design

Atmospheric entry 
Reusable spacecraft include mechanisms to deorbit and reenter the atmosphere in a controlled fashion. For this purpose, the Space Shuttle included OMS pods, and the SpaceX Dragon included its own engines, used for deorbiting. Deorbiting slows the spacecraft down, lowering its perigee to inside the atmosphere where the vehicle descends to Earth.

As a rough rule of thumb, 15% of the landed weight of an atmospheric reentry vehicle needs to be heat shielding.

Thermal Protection Systems (TPS) can be made of a variety of materials, including reinforced carbon-carbon and ablative materials.  Historically these materials were first developed on ICBM MIRVs. However, the requirements of reusable space systems differ from those of single use reentry vehicles, especially with regards to heat shield requirements. In particular the need for durable high emissivity coatings that can withstand multiple thermal cycles constitutes a key requirement in the development of new reusable spacecraft. Current materials for such high emissivity coatings include transition metal disilicides.

Ablative heat shields are reliable, but they can only be used once, and are heavy. Reinforced carbon-carbon heat tiles like those used on the Space Shuttle are fragile, and this was proved on the Space Shuttle Columbia disaster. Making a resistant yet lightweight and effective heat tile poses a challenge. The LI-900 material was used on the Space Shuttle.

Landing and refurbishment
Spacecraft that land horizontally on a runway require wings and undercarriage. These typically consume about 9-12% of the spacecraft mass, which either reduces the payload or increases the size of the spacecraft. Concepts such as lifting bodies offer some reduction in wing mass, as does the delta wing shape of the Space Shuttle orbiter.

Vertical landings can be accomplished either with parachutes or propulsively. SpaceX Dragon was an example of space capsule with parachute reusability. Its derivative, Dragon 2, was originally intended to propusively land on land. However, such concept of reusability was canceled in 2017 and now Dragon 2 uses parachutes to land in the ocean.

After the spacecraft lands, it may need to be refurbished to prepare it for its next flight. This process may be lengthy and expensive, taking up to a year. And the spacecraft may not be able to be recertified as human-rated after refurbishment. There is eventually a limit on how many times a spacecraft can be refurbished before it has to be retired, but how often a spacecraft can be reused differs significantly between the various spacecraft designs.

List of reusable spacecraft

U.S. And ESA

Active
SpaceShipTwo
Dragon 2
Crew Dragon
Cargo Dragon
New Shepard
Boeing X-37

In development 

SpaceX Starship
Dream Chaser
Boeing Starliner
Orion
Space Rider
SUSIE (proposed)

Retired
 North American X-15
 Gemini
 SC-2
Space Shuttle orbiter
Discovery
Challenger (Destroyed in flight)
Columbia (Destroyed in flight)
Enterprise (never flew in space)
Atlantis
Endeavour
SpaceX Dragon

Canceled
Boeing X-20 Dyna-Soar
Hermes

Russian/Soviet
 VA spacecraft
Buran orbiter 
Buran
Ptichka (never flew)
2.01 (never flew)
2.02 (never flew)
2.03 (never flew)

In development
Orel

Canceled
Kliper
MAKS

Others
Chinese next-generation crewed spacecraft
RLV-TD

In development
Avatar

Canceled
HOPE-X

See also
 Reusable launch system

References

 
Spacecraft